Chhimmon  is a village and union council of Mandi Bahauddin District in the Punjab province of Pakistan. It is located at an altitude of 210 metres (691 feet).

References

Union councils of Mandi Bahauddin District
Villages in Mandi Bahauddin District

Gondal villages ... 
Nasar gondal ...